Rhodoblastus sphagnicola is a rod-shaped bacteria with a polar flagella from the genus Rhodoblastus which was isolated from acidic Sphagnum peat from Sosvyatskoe bog in the Tver Region in the West Dvinskiy district in Russia.

References

External links
Type strain of Rhodoblastus sphagnicola at BacDive -  the Bacterial Diversity Metadatabase

Hyphomicrobiales
Bacteria described in 2006